"Tokyo" is the second solo single by the Dutch artist Hans Vandenburg, lead singer of Gruppo Sportivo. It was released in 1995 under Van Record Company in the Netherlands.

The title track is dedicated to Dutch association football club AFC Ajax after the team qualified for the 1995 Intercontinental Cup hosted in Tokyo, by winning the UEFA Champions League title  against Italian side A.C. Milan 1–0 in the final.

Ajax would face-off with Brazilian side Grêmio at the National Stadium on 28 November 1995, winning the Cup 4 – 3 on penalties after extra time.

The single was a one-off collaborative effort between Vandenburg and the Ajax Supporters, organized by Ron de Gruyl and Music Trend Media Amsterdam.

Track listing

See also
 Gruppo Sportivo

References

External links
 Zanger van Gruppo Sportivo zong in 1995 over Ajax in Tokyo on YouTube

1995 singles
AFC Ajax songs
Dutch pop songs
Dutch-language songs
Songs about Tokyo
Football songs and chants
Japan in non-Japanese culture